Fareham may be:
Fareham
Borough of Fareham
Fareham, United States Virgin Islands
Fareham (UK Parliament constituency)
Fareham railway station
Fareham Town F.C.
HMS Fareham (J89)
Fareham red brick
Fareham College
Fort Fareham
Fareham bus station